The Sun Java System Communications Express provides an integrated web-based communication and collaboration client to the Sun Java System Communications Suite. It consists of three client modules: Calendar, Address Book, and Mail. The Calendar and Address Book client modules are deployed as a single application on any web container and are collectively referred to as Unified Web Client (UWC). Sun Java System Communications Express is included with both the Sun Java System Calendar Server and the Sun Java System Messaging Server.

Key features 

 Web access to mail, calendar, tasks, contact list and corporate directory information
 Single sign on, providing seamless interoperability across mail, calendar/tasks and contact management
 Single address book for mail and calendar
 Corporate Address Book
 Support for hosted domains
 Support for multiple address books
 Support for attachments in events and tasks
 Extensible and customizable with company branding, logos, banner ads
 Horizontal scalability for improved efficiency and performance
 Secure email (sign and encrypt) via S/MIME
 Spell-checking while composing mail
 Access control for mail, calendar/tasks and address books
 Sharing of mail, calendar/tasks and address books
 Ability to import/export contact information from Microsoft Outlook or Netscape Communicator address books
 Mail filters for efficient mail disposal
 Vacation message filters
 Address book accessible from Outlook by using the Java System Connector for Microsoft Outlook

External links 

 Sun Java System Communications Express documentation

Java enterprise platform
Sun Microsystems software